Matthew Michael Ball (born 1968) is an American animal activist. He is co-founder and President of One Step for Animals.

Previously, he was Director of Engagement and Outreach at Farm Sanctuary, and before that, Senior Advisor for VegFund. In 1993, Ball co-founded Vegan Outreach. Ball served as the group's Executive Director for 21 years. Ball is credited with helping shift the animal rights' movement to a more utilitarian focus, particularly with a focus on chickens. He is the co-author of The Animal Activist's Handbook (2009), author of The Accidental Activist (2014), and author of Losing My Religions (2022). He was inducted into the Animal Rights Hall of Fame in 2005.

Biography
Ball was born in Toledo, Ohio. His parents are Cornelius Francis Ball and Judith Anderson Ball, both of Toledo. Before founding Vegan Outreach, Matt Ball obtained an M.S. in Forest Ecology at the University of Illinois, and an M.S. in Engineering and Public Policy at Carnegie Mellon University, during which time he was a Department of Energy Global Change Fellow. He also held a research fellowship in the Department of Biology at the University of Pittsburgh.

Ball married Dr. Anne Green, a fellow advocate and co-founder of Vegan Outreach, on February 20, 1993 in Urbana, Illinois. Their child Elwen Katya Green was born on July 16, 1994, in Pennsylvania and was raised as a vegan. They live in Tucson, Arizona.

Ball says: "[W]e must focus on getting people to consider their first step toward compassion, rather than arguing for our current philosophy or diet. Most non-vegetarians tune out when told to go vegan but may consider starting to make changes like adopting Meatless Mondays or eating fewer chickens."

Publications
.
, Foreword by Peter Singer, Introduction by Paul Shapiro.

 Foreword by Ingrid Newkirk.

 Foreword by Michael Klaper, M.D.

See also

Animal protectionism
List of animal rights advocates
List of vegans
Veganism

References

External links
A Meaningful Life, A Better World (Matt Ball's blog)
ARZone interview with Matt Ball
ACE Interviews: Matt Ball
Our Hen House interview with Matt Ball
Clean Meat May Solve Our Factory Farming Problem (interview)

1968 births
Living people
Animal rights activists
American veganism activists
Carnegie Mellon University College of Engineering alumni
People from Toledo, Ohio
University of Illinois alumni